The River Bradford is a river in the Peak District National Park in Derbyshire. Its source is on Gratton Moor and after passing below Youlgreave it joins the River Lathkill at Alport. The river is owned and managed by the Haddon Estate and is home to brown trout and white-clawed crayfish. The valley is known as Bradford Dale, and the Limestone Way passes through it.

See also
List of rivers in England

References

Bradford, River
Bradford
3Bradford